Dot the i is a 2003 psychological thriller film starring Gael García Bernal, Natalia Verbeke, and James D'Arcy.  It was written and directed by Matthew Parkhill.

Plot
Carmen, a young Spanish woman who is engaged to be married, has her hen night at a French restaurant in London. She is invited to participate in the observance of an old custom which allows her to kiss the stranger of her choice before the marriage, symbolically "kissing her single life goodbye" and bringing luck for the future.  The man she chooses is Kit and both enjoy the kiss far more than they have intended. They fall in love, which creates a "love triangle" among Carmen, her fiancé Barnaby, and Kit.

What initially appears to be a typical urban love story begins to take some surprising and dark twists. In the third act, it is revealed that the circumstances have been arranged in order to create an "emotional snuff film". Unbeknownst to Carmen, she has been cast as the female lead in this endeavor. Barnaby has hired Kit to play a part in the deception, but has misled him by neglecting to mention that he himself, the director, will take on the role of Carmen's fiancé (Kit believing that the couple know nothing of the film). Barnaby is apparently unscrupulous, as he actually marries Carmen for the sake of the film and later fakes a violent suicide (his motive being that Carmen will never love him as she does Kit). In a state of shock, she returns to Kit, who is also horrified, guilty, and never having met the husband, still in the dark as to the true identity of a man he knows only as "Ford". He admits to Carmen that he has been paid by a man to seduce her for a film, and that he regrets it immensely.

Barnaby, whom Kit recognizes as his employer, suddenly appears, offering Kit his final pay and removing camera equipment he previously has concealed in the actor's bedsit without his knowledge. With contemptible satisfaction, he unravels his entire plan to the shocked, broken pair and bitterly ridicules them before leaving.

Several months later, as the film is about to open, Barnaby appears to have won Carmen back. For a ceremony during which he is to accept a filmmakers' award, he engineers a publicity stunt by which it appears that Kit will have the ultimate revenge. However, Carmen takes advantage of the opportunity to do in her manipulative husband for real while framing his business partners for murder. Tragedy generates sensation and, while its clueless producers await trial, the film enjoys a big opening at which Carmen and Kit arrive in style, together.

Cast
 Gael García Bernal as Kit Winter – a Brazilian actor living in London, England
 Natalia Verbeke as Carmen Colazzo – a Spaniard who is engaged to Barnaby, but is attracted to Kit
 James D'Arcy as Barnaby F. Caspian – an English film director
 Tom Hardy - Tom
 Charlie Cox - Theo
 Myfanwy Waring - Carmen's Friend
 Michael Webber - Landlord
 Yves Aubert as Maitre d'
 Jonathan Kydd - Burger Bar Manager
 Michael Elwyn - Hotel Manager

Reception
Most American critics did not appreciate the bait-and-switch approach the film took, calling its twist ending "implausible" and "gimmicky". Even Roger Ebert, who was one of the few admirers of Dot the i, said of it: "we walk out of the theater with perplexing questions about motives, means, access and techniques." The film got an extremely limited release and only grossed about $300,000 in the United States.

See also
Naqaab
Meta-reference
List of Spanish films of 2003

Notes

References

External links
 
 
 
 
 Roger Ebert's original review on rogerebert.com

2003 films
2000s erotic thriller films
2003 psychological thriller films
American erotic thriller films
American psychological thriller films
British erotic thriller films
Films about filmmaking
Films about weddings
Spanish erotic thriller films
English-language Spanish films
Summit Entertainment films
Publicity stunts in fiction
Films scored by Javier Navarrete
2000s English-language films
2000s American films
2000s British films
2000s Spanish films
Spanish psychological thriller films
British psychological thriller films